Philippe Contamine (7 May 1932 – 26 January 2022) was a French historian of the Middle Ages who specialised in military history and the history of the nobility.

Contamine was a president of the Académie des Inscriptions et Belles-Lettres, the Société de l'histoire de France, and the Societé des Antiquaires de France. He taught at the Université de Nancy, the Université de Paris X at Nanterre and Université de Paris IV (Paris-Sorbonne). He was an officer of the Légion d’Honneur and a fellow of the Royal Historical Society.

He died on 26 January 2022, at the age of 89.

Select bibliography 
 Guerre, État et Société à la Fin du Moyen Âge. Études sur les armées des rois de France, 1337-1494 (doctoral thesis, Paris, 1972)
 La Guerre au Moyen-Âge (1980)
 La France et l'Angleterre pendant la guerre de Cent Ans, (Hachette, 1982).
 Guerre et Société en France, en Angleterre et en Bourgogne XIVe et XVe siècles (Lille, 1991) 
 Histoire Militaire de la France vol.1 (Paris, 1992)
 'The Soldiery in Late Medieval Society', in French History 8 (1994)
 La noblesse au royaume de France, de Philippe le Bel à Louis XII (1997)
 Histoire de la France politique. I, Le Moyen Âge, 481-1514, le roi, l'Église, les grands, le peuple (2002)

References 

 Biography at the Académie des Inscriptions et Belles-Lettres

1932 births
2022 deaths
20th-century French historians
Officiers of the Légion d'honneur
Members of the Académie des Inscriptions et Belles-Lettres
French medievalists
University of Paris alumni
Academic staff of Nancy-Université
Academic staff of the University of Paris
Writers from Metz
Fellows of the Royal Historical Society
Lycée Louis-le-Grand teachers
21st-century French historians